Oulmes may refer to:

Brands
Oulmes: A Moroccan brand of naturally carbonated, bottled mineral water

Places
Oulmes, Vendée: A French commune in the Vendée department
Oulmes, Morocco: A city in Morocco